The Roosevelt Elementary School at 200 E. Arlington St. in Waterloo, Iowa was built during 1921-22 and extended in 1954.  It was a Late Gothic Revival architecture work by Waterloo architect Mortimer B. Cleveland.

It was listed on the National Register of Historic Places in 2004.  It was deemed significant in the areas of education and architecture.  As for education, its library served the local community as well as the school.

References

National Register of Historic Places in Black Hawk County, Iowa
School buildings on the National Register of Historic Places in Iowa
Gothic Revival architecture in Iowa
School buildings completed in 1922
Buildings and structures in Waterloo, Iowa
1922 establishments in Iowa